This page covers all relevant details regarding PFC Cherno More Varna for all official competitions inside the 1981–82 season. These are A Group and Bulgarian Cup.

Squad

Matches

A Group

League table

Results summary

League performance

Goalscorers in A Group

Bulgarian Cup

References

PFC Cherno More Varna seasons
Cherno More Varna